William Henry Banner (1878–1936) was an English footballer who played in the Football League for Chesterfield Town.

References

1878 births
1936 deaths
English footballers
Association football defenders
English Football League players
Dronfield Town F.C. players
Chesterfield F.C. players
Queens Park Rangers F.C. players
Denaby United F.C. players